Epton is a surname. Notable people with the surname include:

Alex Epton, better known as XXXChange, Brooklyn-based musician, record producer, remixer and DJ
Bernard Epton (1921–1987), American politician who served in the Illinois House of Representatives
Bill Epton (1932–2002), Maoist African-American activist
Ian Epton, wrestler from Zambia
Mark Epton (born 1965), retired flyweight boxer from England
Nina Epton (born 1913), British radio producer and travel writer

See also
Bepton
Eton (disambiguation)
Klepton
Lepton
Repton